Edinburgh Pentlands has been the name of two parliamentary constituencies:
 Edinburgh Pentlands (UK Parliament constituency),a constituency represented in the House of Commons of the Parliament of the United Kingdom, 1950–2005
 Edinburgh Pentlands (Scottish Parliament constituency), a constituency represented in the Scottish Parliament since 1999